Luachimo is a commune of Angola, located in the province of Lunda Norte. The city of Dundo is located in the commune.

See also 

 Communes of Angola

References 

Populated places in Angola